The Cincinnati Female Seminary was a seminary in Cincinnati, Ohio. The seminary was located at the southwest corner of W Seventh and Mound Streets. The seminary started as a private seminary c. 1849 and run by T. A. Burrowes.  By the fifth year there were 136 pupils.

Funds were raised in 1854 for a public seminary of the same name, with a target of $35,000.   The board of trustees was interdenominational.  The inaugural principal was to be Burrowes. "By an arrangement entered into by the proprietors of the Cincinnati Female Seminary and the Mount Auburn Young Ladies’ Institute, the former was transferred to Mount Auburn, and the two schools consolidated into one in September, 1861."

Notable alumni
 Susan Fessenden, (1840–1932), temperance activist

Notable staff
 Rachel Littler Bodley, teacher of natural sciences (1862-5)

References

Seminaries and theological colleges in Ohio
Universities and colleges in Cincinnati